William Farrar was an American football official, player and coach, rower, and a dentist. He was the first football coach for the Vermont Catamounts in 1897. Farrar rowed and play football at the University of Pennsylvania. On the football team he was a tackle.

Head coaching record

References

Year of birth missing
Year of death missing
American football tackles
Penn Quakers football players
Vermont Catamounts football coaches
Penn Quakers rowers